Aren't Men Beasts! is a 1937 British comedy film directed by Graham Cutts and starring Robertson Hare, Alfred Drayton and Billy Milton.

Premise
A number of people try to prevent a man getting married.

Cast
 Robertson Hare as Herbert Holly
 Alfred Drayton as Thomas Potter
 Billy Milton as Roger Holly
 June Clyde as Marie
 Kathleen Harrison as Annie
 Ruth Maitland as Selina Potter
 Ellen Pollock as Vamp
 Frank Royde as Policeman
 Amy Veness as Mrs. Flower
 Victor Stanley as Harry Harper
 Charles Mortimer as Detective
 Frederick Morant as George Deck
 Anne Boyd as Louise Baker
 Judy Kelly as Yvette Bingham

Production
The film was based on a play of the same name by Vernon Sylvaine. It was made at Elstree Studios by British International Pictures. John Mead worked on the film as art director.

References

External links
 

1937 films
1937 comedy films
British films based on plays
Films shot at British International Pictures Studios
Films directed by Graham Cutts
British comedy films
Films set in England
British black-and-white films
1930s English-language films
1930s British films